Written in Waters is the debut studio album by the Norwegian avant-garde metal band Ved Buens Ende. It is the only album the band released before they disbanded.

Track listing
All music by Ved Buens Ende. All lyrics by Carl-Michael Eide, except "Den Saakaldte" by Vicotnik.
"I Sang for the Swans" – 7:01
"You, That May Wither" – 4:54
"It's Magic" – 5:25
"Den Saakaldte" ("The So-Called") – 8:49
"Carrier of Wounds" – 7:40
"Coiled in Wings" – 7:04
"Autumn Leaves" – 5:07
"Remembrance of Things Past" – 8:54
"To Swarm Deserted Away" – 2:14

Critical reception 

William York of AllMusic wrote, "Ved Buens Ende's sole full-length, Written in Waters, is an album of esoteric, experimental black metal that, years after its release, still sounds like nothing else."

Personnel
Ved Buens Ende
Yusaf Parvez (credited as "Vicotnik") - harsh vocals, electric guitar
Hugh Mingay (credited as "Skoll") - bass guitar, keyboards, additional vocals (on "It's Magic")
Carl-Michael Eide - clean vocals, drums, percussion

Additional Musicians
Lill Kathrine Stensrud - backing vocals

Production Staff
Ved Buens Ende - production, arrangements
Pål Espen Johannessen (credited as "Pål") - recording, mixing, engineering
Lise Myhre (credited as "Lise") - cover art

References

External links
"Written In Waters" at discogs: link

Ved Buens Ende albums
1995 debut albums